Charles Glen Little Jr. (born April 29, 1963) is an American former professional stock car racing driver. He holds a degree in marketing from Washington State University and a J.D. degree from Gonzaga University. While attending Washington State University, he joined the Delta Upsilon fraternity.

Little currently works at NASCAR as managing director for technical inspection and officiating. Little had previously been director of the Camping World Truck Series, as well as the director of racing development for Mexico and the Whelen Modified Tour. He keeps regular office hours in the sanctioning body's research and development center in Concord, North Carolina. He also was a part-time studio analyst for Speed Channel. He is the father of Jesse Little.

Early years 
Little began racing the short tracks in Washington in the mid-1980s. He soon began racing in the American Speed Association West late model series, the NASCAR Northwest Tour Series and the NASCAR Winston West Series. One year after being named the NASCAR Winston West Rookie of the Year, Little clinched that series' championship in 1987.

Little made his NASCAR Winston Cup debut in 1986 at Riverside International Raceway, driving the No. 28 Ford owned by George Jefferson. He started 25th and finished 13th. He ran the other Riverside race that year but finished 35th after suffering engine failure. He ran both the Riverside races the next year, finishing 15th both times in the No. 95 Coors Ford.

The following year, Little was eligible for NASCAR Winston Cup Rookie of the Year honors and signed to drive the No. 90 for Junie Donlavey. However, his best finish was an eighteenth, at the Coca-Cola 600, and he was released early in the season. In 1989, he missed United Airlines Flight 232. About a third of the passengers aboard the flight perished during its emergency landing in Iowa.  In 1990, Little and his father Chuck teamed to field their own entry, the No. 19 Ford sponsored by Bull's Eye Barbecue Sauce. He ran eighteen races and had seven top-twenty finishes, garnering a 33rd-place points finish. The following season, Little made his first full-time attempt at winning the Cup championship, qualifying for 28 out of 29 races and posting a tenth-place finish at Charlotte Motor Speedway, finishing 27th in points.

Busch Series 
In 1992, Little signed to drive the No. 66 TropArctic-sponsored Ford for Cale Yarborough but was released six races into the season. Later, he caught on to the No. 9 Ford fielded by Melling Racing and had an eighth-place finish at Talladega. He also made his Busch Series debut that year, starting and finishing 29th in the No. 37 Maxx Race Cards-sponsored Oldsmobile at Watkins Glen International.

In 1993, Little, along with Greg Pollex and former NFL quarterback Mark Rypien, formed Mark Rypien Motorsports, running the No. 23 If It's Paper-Bayer Select-sponsored Ford on a limited basis that year, posting a second-place finish at Dover International Speedway. The next year, the team went full time and Little had 10 top-five finishes, finishing third in points. He also drove the No. 97 Ford at the Daytona 500 that season, finishing 29th. In 1995, Little broke through and won six races during the course of the season, including the first two races of the season, at Daytona and Rockingham, and finished second in points, behind Johnny Benson. His other wins were at Loudon, Charlotte, Talladega and South Boston. Little did not win a race the following season, however, and slipped to sixth in points. He also ran nine Cup races, five in Pollex's No. 97 Sterling Cowboy-sponsored Pontiac Grand Prix, and another four for Diamond Ridge Motorsports, posting a 20th-place finish at Darlington Raceway,

Winston Cup 

In 1997, Little returned to the Cup Series, running the No. 97 Pontiac for Pollex with a sponsorship from John Deere. He finished seventh at the Food City 500, but the team struggled to make races. Late in the year, Jack Roush purchased the team to be added to his stable for 1998. Little ended 1997 36th in points.

In 1998, Little drove for Roush full time with Jeff Hammond as crew chief. Running 32 out of 33 races, he had seven top-tens, including a second-place run at Texas, finishing behind Mark Martin, and finished a career-high 15th in points. He was unable to duplicate that performance in 1999, posting just five top-tens and finishing 23rd in points. After just one top-ten in 2000, Roush announced Little would not drive the 97 the following season. Late in the year, Little was pulled out of the car and replaced by his successor, Kurt Busch, with Hammond still as crew chief. During the season, he also ran a handful of races in the Busch Series. Originally running the No. 30 for Innovative Motorsports, he was released and posted a top-ten in a one-race deal with PPI Motorsports.

Little had 217 career Cup starts in all.

Final years as driver 
In 2001, Little signed to drive the No. 74 Staff America-sponsored Chevrolet Monte Carlo for BACE Motorsports in the Busch Series. He had six Top 10’s and finished ninth in points. He started off 2002 running for BACE, but the team closed after three races due to sponsor issues. He made his final Cup start in a BACE car at Dover that year, finishing 33rd. He has not run NASCAR since.

Post-driving career 
In 2004, Chad called several Truck and Xfinity races from the booth.

Chad later provided competition support for the NASCAR Mexico Corona Series, and became the tour director for the Whelen Modified Tour.

Starting in 2013, Chad took on the role of NASCAR Camping World Truck Series managing director. On February 2, 2015, NASCAR announced that Little would be moving into a new role, as a managing director of technical inspection and officiating. His role as director was replaced by another former driver, Elton Sawyer.

Motorsports career results

NASCAR
(key) (Bold – Pole position awarded by qualifying time. Italics – Pole position earned by points standings or practice time. * – Most laps led.)

Winston Cup Series

Daytona 500

Busch Series

SuperTruck Series

References

External links 

Archived NASCAR.com page

Living people
1963 births
Sportspeople from Spokane, Washington
Racing drivers from Washington (state)
NASCAR drivers
American Speed Association drivers
Motorsport announcers
American lawyers
Gonzaga University alumni
Washington State University alumni
John Deere
RFK Racing drivers